The 1990 Men's Asian Games Basketball Tournament was held in China from September 23, 1990 to October 6, 1990.

Results

Preliminary round

Group A

Group B

Group C

Group D

Quarterfinals

Group I

Group II

Group III

Group IV

Classification 5th–10th

9th place game

7th place game

5th place game

Final round

Semifinals

Bronze medal game

Gold medal game

Final standing

References
Results

External links
Basketball Results

Men